Barley tea is a roasted-grain-based infusion made from barley. It is a staple across many East Asian countries such as China, Japan, Korea and Taiwan. It has a toasty, bitter flavor. 

In Korea, the tea is consumed either hot or cold, often taking the place of drinking water in many homes and restaurants. In Japan, it is usually served cold and is a popular summertime refreshment. The tea is also widely available in tea bags or bottled in Korea and Japan.

Etymology 
In China, barley tea is called dàmài-chá or mài-chá, in which dàmài or mài means "barley" and chá means "tea".

In Japan, barley tea is called mugi-cha, which shares the same Chinese characters as Chinese mài-chá, or mugi-yu, in which yu also means "hot water".

In Korea, barley tea is called bori-cha, in which the native Korean bori means "barley" and Sino-Korean cha shares the same Chinese character meaning "tea".

In Taiwan, barley tea is called be̍h-á-tê, in which be̍h-á means "barley" and tê means "tea".

History 
The Japanese aristocracy has consumed the tea since the Heian Period.. Samurai began to consume it in Sengoku period..  During the Edo period, street stalls specializing in barley tea became popular among the common people.

Availability

The tea can be prepared by boiling roasted unhulled barley kernels in water or brewing roasted and ground barley in hot water. In Japan, tea bags containing ground barley became more popular than the traditional barley kernels during the early 1980s and remain the norm today. The tea is also available prepackaged in PET bottles.

Bottled tea 
Bottled barley tea is sold at supermarkets, convenience stores, and in vending machines in Japan and Korea. Sold mostly in PET bottles, cold barley tea is a very popular summertime drink in Japan. In Korea, hot barley tea in heat-resistant PET bottles is also found in vending machines and in heated cabinets in convenience stores.

Blended barley and similar teas 
In Korea, roasted barley is also often combined with roasted corn, as the corn's sweetness offsets the slightly bitter flavor of the barley. The tea made from roasted corn is called oksusu-cha (corn tea), and the tea made from roasted corn and roasted barley is called oksusu-bori-cha (corn barley tea). Several similar drinks made from roasted grains include hyeonmi-cha (brown rice tea), gyeolmyeongja-cha (sicklepod seed tea), and memil-cha (buckwheat tea).

Roasted barley tea, sold in ground form and sometimes combined with chicory or other ingredients, is also sold as a coffee substitute.

Nutrition 
Barley tea is rich in antioxidants, including chlorogenic and vanillic acids, and quercetin, but contains trace amounts of an antinutrient called acrylamide.

See also 

 Barley water
 Caffè d'orzo
 Caro (drink)
 Postum
 List of barley-based beverages
 Roasted grain beverage

References 

Barley-based drinks
Chinese tea
Coffee substitutes
Japanese tea
East Asian drinks
Herbal tea
Korean tea